Hazard H. Sheldon House, also known as the Sheldon-Benham House, is a historic home located at Niagara Falls in Niagara County, New York.  It was built about 1857 and is a -story, "L"-shaped dwelling built of native gorge stone in the Italian Villa style.  It has a low pitched gable roof with deep overhanging eaves.  From 1857 to 1900, it was the home of Hazard H. Sheldon (1821-1900), an important figure in the early civic affairs of Niagara Falls.

It was listed on the National Register of Historic Places in 2011.

References

Houses on the National Register of Historic Places in New York (state)
Houses completed in 1857
Italianate architecture in New York (state)
Houses in Niagara County, New York
National Register of Historic Places in Niagara County, New York
1857 establishments in New York (state)